White Rock Christian Academy (WRCA) is a Pre-K to Grade 12 Christian private school in South Surrey, British Columbia, Canada. WRCA states its core purpose is to "inspire and cultivate citizens of Godly character who transform their world for Christ".

History
White Rock Christian Academy opened its gates in November 1981 using Accelerated Christian Education (ACE) as its core curriculum. In September 1991 the curriculum was changed from ACE to a B.C.-approved curriculum taught from a distinctly Christian perspective. WRCA has developed over the years into a Ministry of Education-certified institute with a quickly growing enrollment of international students from Preschool all the way to Grade 12. As of September 2020, enrollment is over 569 students with over 66 faculty members and support staff. The Junior school has two and a half classes per class, ranging from 18 to 24 students per class. Today, the school offers the Baccalaureate International program to all students.

Facilities 
The school has three main buildings, including Preschool to Grade 12, a gravel field, gymnasium, art room, music rooms, science labs and administrative offices. Currently the campus is undergoing redevelopment funded by private donations, largely from parents and financing from a Canadian Bank.

Programs

Academics

WRCA is currently offering the International Baccalaureate continuum program, offering Primary Years (PYP), Middle Years (MYP) and Diploma (DP) Programmes. Every course is taught from a biblical Christian worldview. In addition, Bible is taught as one of the mandatory subjects in the school. Students are challenged to acquire knowledge and to use this knowledge to impact their present and future community for good.

Arts

The school arts program develops students through creative and innovative expressions in visual art, band, choir and musical theater. Every year the school opens its doors and invite the community to enjoy a music production. Every student is also required to learn an instrument and participate in a school concert twice a year.

Athletics

WRCA has a history of athletic excellence. Competing against larger schools, athletes have won several Fraser Valley and Provincial Championships in Basketball, Volleyball and Track and Field. The boys basketball program has produced 5-time Senior Provincial Champions, 6-time Senior Fraser Valley Champions, 12-time Surrey RCMP Tournament Champions, Junior Provincial Champions, and 2-time Junior Fraser Valley Champions. The girls volleyball program has produced 5-time Senior Provincial Champions, 12-time Senior Fraser Valley Champions, and Grade 8 Surrey Champions. The Cross country program has produced 6-time Fraser Valley Champions and 2013 BCCSSAA Champions. The Track and Field program have produced 10-time Individual Provincial Champions, 2014 and 2022 Surrey Champions and 2022 South Frasers Champions. In 2016, the WRCA Senior Girls Volleyball team won the 'A' Provincial Championship.

Mission and Service Learning

WRCA service and mission program encourages serving through local and global mission projects. The program follows an outline of seeing (grades JK–2), caring (grades 3–5), knowing (grades 6–10) and going (grades 11–12). Students over the years begin locally and then out on mission trips to countries around the world.

Extracurricular
WRCA has a number of extracurricular opportunities that students are encouraged to participate in, and many are integrated into the school curriculum.

References

External links

Christian schools in Canada
International Baccalaureate schools in British Columbia
Private schools in British Columbia
Education in Surrey, British Columbia
Educational institutions established in 1981
1981 establishments in British Columbia